St. Martin of Tours Catholic Church is a parish of the Catholic Church in Valley City, Ohio, in the Diocese of Cleveland. It is noted for its historic church, which was built in 1861 and added to the National Register of Historic Places in 1975.

References

External links
 

Churches in the Roman Catholic Diocese of Cleveland
Churches on the National Register of Historic Places in Ohio
Gothic Revival church buildings in Ohio
Roman Catholic churches completed in 1861
Churches in Medina County, Ohio
National Register of Historic Places in Medina County, Ohio
1861 establishments in Ohio
Religious organizations established in 1861
19th-century Roman Catholic church buildings in the United States